Arroyo Del Agua, is a populated place in Rio Arriba County, New Mexico, United States. It lies at an elevation of  along the north bank of the Rio Puerco, above its confluence with its tributary Salitral Creek.

History
Arroyo Del Agua, is mentioned in the itinerary of Antonio Armijo as a stopping place of his expedition that pioneered his 1829-1830 route of the Old Spanish Trail between Santa Fe, New Mexico and Mission San Gabriel in California.

References

 

Unincorporated communities in Rio Arriba County, New Mexico
Unincorporated communities in New Mexico
Populated places in Rio Arriba County, New Mexico
Old Spanish Trail (trade route)